Blacktip may refer to:

 Australian blacktip shark, an Oceanian shark
 Blacktip grouper, a widely distributed grouper
 Blacktip reef shark, an Indo-Pacific shark
 Blacktip sawtail catshark, a West Pacific shark
 Blacktip shark, a widely distributed shark
 Blacktip tope, an Indo-West Pacific shark
 Blacktip trevally, a jack fish
 Smooth tooth blacktip shark, a Gulf of Aden shark
 Euchloe charlonia, a butterfly sometimes called the blacktip
 Blacktips (FXFL), an American football team